Simon Fraser University (SFU) is a public research university in British Columbia, Canada, with three campuses, all in Greater Vancouver: Burnaby (main campus), Surrey, and Vancouver. The university was created in an effort to expand higher education across Canada.

SFU is a member of multiple national and international higher education associations, including the Association of Commonwealth Universities, International Association of Universities, and Universities Canada. SFU has also partnered with other universities and agencies to operate joint research facilities such as the TRIUMF, Canada's national laboratory for particle and nuclear physics, which houses the world's largest cyclotron, and Bamfield Marine Station, a major centre for teaching and research in marine biology.

Undergraduate and graduate programs at SFU operate on a year-round, three-semester schedule. Consistently ranked as Canada's top comprehensive university and named to the Times Higher Education list of 100 world universities under 50, SFU is also the first Canadian member of the National Collegiate Athletic Association, the world's largest college sports association, as well as its only member outside of the United States. In 2015, SFU became the second Canadian university to receive accreditation from the Northwest Commission on Colleges and Universities. SFU faculty and alumni have won 43 fellowships to the Royal Society of Canada, three Rhodes Scholarships and one Pulitzer Prize. Among the list of alumni includes three premiers of British Columbia (Glen Clark, Gordon Campbell and Ujjal Dosanjh), Vancouver Canucks owner Francesco Aquilini, Prime Minister of Lesotho Pakalitha Mosisili, Max Planck Institute director Robert Turner, and humanitarian and cancer research activist Terry Fox.

History

Simon Fraser University was founded upon the recommendation of a 1962 report entitled Higher Education in British Columbia and a Plan for the Future by John B. Macdonald. He recommended the creation of a new university in the Lower Mainland and the British Columbia Legislature gave formal assent on March 1, 1963, for the establishment of the university in Burnaby. The university was named after Simon Fraser, a North West Company fur trader and explorer. The original name of the school was Fraser University, but was changed because the initials "FU" evoked the profane phrase "fuck you". In May of the same year, Gordon M. Shrum was appointed as the university's first chancellor. From a variety of sites that were offered, Shrum recommended to the provincial government that the summit of Burnaby Mountain, 365 meters above sea level, be chosen for the new university. Architects Arthur Erickson and Geoffrey Massey won a competition to design the university, and construction began in the spring of 1964. The campus faces northwest over Burrard Inlet. Eighteen months later, on September 9, 1965, the university began its first semester with 2,500 students.

The campus was noted in the 1960s and early 1970s as a hotbed of political activism, culminating in a crisis in the Department of Political Science, Sociology, and Anthropology in a dispute involving ideological differences among faculty. The resolution to the crisis included the dismantling of the department into today's separate departments. During this time, Thelma Finlayson became the university's first female faculty member in the Department of Biological Sciences. She would later become their first professor emerita upon her retirement in 1979.

21st century
In 2007, the university began offering dual and double degree programs by partnering with international universities, such as a dual computing-science degree through partnership with Zhejiang University in China and a double Bachelor of Arts degree in conjunction with Australia's Monash University. It has also partnered with India's Premiere "Indian Institute of Technology, Bombay".

In 2009, SFU became the first Canadian university to be accepted into the National Collegiate Athletic Association (NCAA). Starting in the 2011–2012 season, SFU competed in the NCAA's Division II Great Northwest Athletic Conference (GNAC) and has now transitioned all 19 Simon Fraser teams into the NCAA.

On September 9, 2015, SFU celebrated its 50th anniversary. Over its 50 years, the university educated over 130,000 graduates.

In early 2022, Burnaby City Council announced they would officially support the SFU Gondola as part of the TransLink expansion project. This is included in the Mayors’ Council’s approval of the Transport 2050 regional transportation strategy announcement.

Campuses

Simon Fraser University has three campuses, each located in different parts of Greater Vancouver. SFU's original campus is located in Burnaby, atop Burnaby Mountain. The Vancouver campus consists of multiple buildings in downtown Vancouver and the Surrey campus is located inside Central City.

The downtown campus has expanded to include several other buildings in recent years, including the Segal Graduate School of Business. In September 2010, SFU Contemporary Arts moved into the Woodward's redevelopment, known as the Goldcorp Centre for the Arts.

SFU's three campuses are all accessible by public transit. The Vancouver campus is a block away from the Waterfront SkyTrain station while the Surrey campus is adjacent to the Surrey Central SkyTrain station. The Burnaby campus is linked to the Production Way–University, Burquitlam, and Sperling–Burnaby Lake SkyTrain stations by frequent shuttle bus service.

Burnaby campus

The main campus is located atop Burnaby Mountain, on Traditional Coast Salish Lands, including the Tsleil-Waututh (səl̓ilw̓ətaʔɬ), Kwikwetlem (kʷikʷəƛ̓əm), Squamish (Sḵwx̱wú7mesh Úxwumixw) and Musqueam (xʷməθkʷəy̓əm) Nations. The campus is at an elevation of 365 metres, overlooking the Burrard inlet to the north. All major departments in the university are housed at the Burnaby campus. The library on the main campus is called the W. A. C. Bennett Library, named after the Social Credit Premier of B.C. who established it. The campus also has two gym complexes, named the Lorne-Davies Complex and Chancellor's Gym. An international-sized swimming pool is located within the Lorne-Davies Complex. Since the School of Contemporary Arts relocation to the Woodward's location, the Burnaby campus production theatre has been vacant. Located within the heart of the campus are the Museum of Archaeology and Ethnology and three art galleries. The campus has been awarded numerous architectural awards over the years, including the gold medal for Lieutenant-Governor 2009 Awards in Architecture and the 2007 Royal Architectural Institute of Canada's Prix du XXe siècle.

The Burnaby campus is composed of a vast complex of interconnected buildings spanning across  of land on Burnaby Mountain, from the eastern end of the campus to the western side, where the UniverCity urban village is located. The campus consists of the following buildings:

 West Mall Complex (WMC)
 Lorne Davies Gym Complex
 Chancellor's Gym Complex
 Convocation Mall
 W. A. C. Bennett Library
 Halpern Centre
 Maggie Benston Centre (MBC)
 SFU Theatre
 Gym, Pool, Fitness Centre
 Robert C. Brown Hall (RCB)
 Academic Quadrangle (AQ)
 Shrum Science Centre (SSC)
 SSC Biology (B)
 SSC Biomedical Physiology and Kinesiology (K)
 SSC Chemistry (C)
 SSC Physics (P)
 South Science Building (SSB)
 Applied Sciences Building (ASB)
 Education Building (EB)
 Technology and Science Complex (TASC) I
 Technology and Science Complex (TASC) II
 4D LABS
 Blusson Hall (BLU)
 Saywell Hall (ASSC)
 Strand Hall
 Trottier Observatory and Science Courtyard

Due to the contemporary Brutalist architecture of the Burnaby Mountain campus, many buildings, including the WAC Bennett Library and Academic Quadrangle have been used for location shots in various films and television programmes over the years.

Library, archives, museums and galleries
Each campus has its own library, the largest of which is the W.A.C. Bennett Library based on the SFU Burnaby campus, which holds over 2.7 million print and microform volumes.

SFU also has a Museum of Archeology and Ethnology, which holds many exhibits created by students as part of the museum studies courses offered in the Department of Archaeology. Archaeological collections arising from excavations and other research by faculty, staff and students are housed in the museum. Several large wooden sculptures ('totem') poles from the Royal British Columbia Museum in Victoria represent the major art traditions of the indigenous coastal peoples of British Columbia. The museum holds an extensive collection of Indonesian wayang kulit shadow puppets and ethnographic objects from around the world. The museum's image collection holds over 120,000 35 mm slides and digital images of archaeological and ethnographic interest.

The SFU Library's Digital Collections provide internet access to digitized documents from a number of archival collections, such as Harrison Brown's Xi'an Incident collection, and the history of British Columbia and Western Canada in general, including documents from the Doukhobor migration from the Russian Empire to Saskatchewan and then to British Columbia assembled for donation to the university by John Keenlyside. Other highlights of the collection include The Vancouver Punk Collection, which includes more than 1200 posters as well as photographs, zines, and ephemera, the British Columbia Postcards Collection, and more than 9800 editorial cartoons from Canadian newspapers.

Simon Fraser University's art galleries include: SFU Gallery on the Burnaby campus (established 1970), Audain Gallery at the Goldcorp Centre for the Arts in Vancouver (established 2010), and Teck Gallery at Harbour Centre in Vancouver (established 1989). SFU Galleries stewards the Simon Fraser University Art Collection, which includes, in its holdings of over 5,500 works, significant regional and national artworks spanning the last century.

The Bill Reid Centre for Northwest Coast Art Studies at SFU houses a collection of 50,000 objects, primarily digital images and digitized textual documents, which document the art, culture and history of different First Nations cultures of the Northwest Coast. The collection includes explorers' drawings, sketches, paintings and original photography.

Residences 

The SFU Burnaby campus provides residence to 1766 SFU and FIC students in 6 different areas, all located on the western side of the campus.

 The Towers (officially opened in fall of 2004) are three dormitory-style buildings. One of the Towers features a 14-room hotel called "The Simon Hotel".
 McTaggart-Cowan Hall (built in 1985), a traditional-style dormitory building.
 Shell House (built in 1967), traditional-style dormitory building.
 The Townhouse Complex (built in 1993) are 3-level townhouse units accommodating up to 4 students per unit. There are a total of 99 units.
 Hamilton Hall (built in 1993 and renovated in 2009) is a studio-style building for graduate students.
 Louis Riel House (built in 1969 and closed in 2015) was an apartment-style building (unfurnished) used for family and graduate housing. Although the residents tried to prevent the building's closure, it officially closed in September 2015, due to mould problems.

UniverCity 

UniverCity is an urban community located on top of Burnaby Mountain, adjacent to Simon Fraser University. It has won several awards for sustainable planning and development. Envisioned in 1963 by Arthur Erickson and Geoffrey Massey, the area adjacent to the university was not officially rezoned for development until 30 years later. Development of the community began in early 2000, when Simon Fraser University commenced construction on a new residential and commercial area occupying approximately  adjacent to the campus. , approximately 3000 people live in UniverCity. The main commercial district on University High Street now houses restaurants, stores, and a 20,000 square foot Nester's Market. A new elementary school, University Highlands Elementary, opened on September 1, 2010. Several new residential developments are currently in progress, including the construction of a 12-storey high rise in the heart of UniverCity.

Surrey campus 

The Surrey campus consists of two buildings located in Whalley / City Centre, Surrey. The main building is part of Central City, an architectural complex adjacent to the Surrey Central SkyTrain station. It was established in 2002 to absorb the students and programs of the former Technical University of British Columbia, which was closed by the provincial government. It has since expanded to house the Surrey operations of other SFU programs. The Central City complex that houses the campus was designed by architect Bing Thom and opened in 2006. The Fraser Library, a branch of the SFU Library, is located at the second floor on this campus and is the only branch with a games room, where arcade games and console games are available. It also loans equipment to students in the School of Interactive Arts and Technology.

A separate five-floor building opened on April 25, 2019, across the street from the existing Central City complex. The  building is LEED Gold certified and mainly houses the Sustainability Energy Engineering (SEE) program and supports 440 full-time students with engineering labs, computer labs, classrooms, lecture halls and office spaces.

Vancouver campus 

The Vancouver campus was launched in the 1980s with a storefront classroom. It was the first urban university classroom in British Columbia. A significant portion of funding for the building of the campus came from the private sector. The Vancouver campus has eight buildings spread across the downtown core: SFU Harbour Centre, the Morris J. Wosk Centre for Dialogue, the Segal Graduate School of Business, SFU Contemporary Arts at the restored Woodward's Building, SFU Charles Chang Innovation Centre, SFU Vancity Office of Community Engagement at 312 Main, SFU VentureLabs, SFU Collection at Bill Reid Gallery of Northwest Coast Art, and SFU Contemporary Arts at 611 Alexander Visual Arts Studio. The original campus building at Harbour Centre, a rebuilt heritage department store, officially opened on May 5, 1989. Today, the entire campus serves more than 70,000 people annually. Approximately 10,000 are graduate and undergraduate students enrolled in courses and degree programs based downtown. The Belzberg Library is based at the Vancouver campus. 

In September 2010, SFU Contemporary Arts relocated to the historic Woodward's district in downtown Vancouver known as the Goldcorp Centre for the Arts. The  SFU facility is part of the Woodward's revitalization project. The new facility accommodates the increasing enrolment of students in the programme and new cultural facilities, including the Fei and Milton Wong Experimental theatre, screening rooms, sound studios, and art galleries.

Governance
The university is governed in accordance with the British Columbia University Act.

Convocation
The convocation is composed of all faculty members, senators, and graduates (degree holders, including honorary alumni) of the university. Its main function is to elect the 4 convocation senators. Convocation ceremonies are held twice annually to confer degrees (including honorary degrees) as well as award diplomas and certificates.

Board of governors

The board is composed of the chancellor, the president, two student members, two faculty members, one staff member, and eight individuals appointed by the British Columbia government. Conventionally, the board is chaired by one of the government appointees. The board is responsible for the general management and governance of the university.

Board members :

 Christopher Lewis, board chair, alumni order-in-council
 Dr. Tamara Vrooman, O.B.C., chancellor
 Professor Joy Johnson, president
 Mike Cordoba, alumni order-in-council
 Corbett Gildersleve, undergraduate student member
 Alexandra Gunn, graduate student member
 Angie Hall, order-in-council
 Carolyn Hanna, staff member
 Dr. Anke Kessler, faculty member
 Dr. Mary-Catherine Kropinski, faculty member
 Mike Lombardi, order-in-council
 Paula Martin, order-in-council
 James Stewart, deputy board chair, order-in-council
 Denise Williams, alumni order-in-council
 Joan Young, order-in-council
 Li-Jeen Broshko, general counsel and acting university secretary
 Valerie Rodden, board of governors' assistant
 Nicole Shin, board of governors' assistant

Senate
The senate is composed of the chancellor, the president, vice-president, academic, vice-president, research, deans of faculties, dean of graduate studies, dean of continuing studies, associate vice-president, academic, university librarian, registrar (as senate secretary), 14 student members, 28 faculty members, and 4 convocation members (who are not faculty members). The senate is chaired by the president. The academic governance of the university is vested in the senate.

Chancellor
The chancellor is appointed by the board of governors on nomination by the alumni association and after consultation with the senate for a three-year term, which can be renewed once. The main responsibilities of the chancellor are to confer degrees and represent the university in formal functions.

 Gordon M. Shrum (January 1, 1964 – May 31, 1968)
 Kenneth P. Caple (June 1, 1968 – May 31, 1975)
 Jack Diamond (June 1, 1975 – May 31, 1978)
 Paul T. Cote (June 1, 1978 – June 15, 1984)
 William M. Hamilton (June 15, 1984 – May 31, 1987)
 Barbara J. Rae (June 5, 1987 – June 4, 1993)
 Joseph Segal (June 5, 1993 – June 4, 1999)
 Milton Wong (June 5, 1999 – May 31, 2005)
 Brandt Louie (June 1, 2005 – June 17, 2011)
 Carole Taylor (June 17, 2011 – June 13, 2014)
 Anne Giardini (June 13, 2014 – June 13, 2020)
 Tamara Vrooman (June 13, 2020 to present)

President and vice-chancellor
The board of governors appoints the president and vice-chancellor based on a selection process jointly established by the board of governors and the university's senate. As the chief executive officer and chair of the senate, the president is responsible for the day-to-day administration of the university.

The last president that was appointed was Joy Johnson, who began her term on September 1, 2020. Johnson succeeded Andrew Petter, who held a decade-long post as president from 2010 to 2020. Johnson's term ends on September 1, 2025, after which she may choose to seek another 5-year term.

 Patrick McTaggart-Cowan (January 1, 1964 – May 31, 1968)
 Kenneth Strand (Acting) (August 1, 1968 – July 31, 1969)
 Kenneth Strand (September 8, 1969 – August 31, 1974)
 Pauline Jewett (September 1, 1974 – October 9, 1978)
 K. George Pedersen (January 1, 1979 – March 31, 1983)
 William G. Saywell (September 1, 1983 – March 1, 1993)
 John O. Stubbs (August 1, 1993 – January 31, 1998)
 Jack P. Blaney (Pro Tem) (September 15, 1997 – January 31, 1998)
 Jack P. Blaney (February 1, 1998 – November 30, 2000)
 Michael Stevenson (December 1, 2000 – August 30, 2010)
 Prof. Andrew Petter (September 1, 2010 – August 31, 2020)
 Prof. Joy Johnson (September 1, 2020 – present)

Academics
There are eight faculties at Simon Fraser University:

 Faculty of Applied Science
 Faculty of Arts and Social Sciences
 Beedie School of Business
 Faculty of Communication, Art and Technology
 Faculty of Education
 Faculty of Environment
 Faculty of Health Sciences
 Faculty of Science

Undergraduate
In the Fall 2021 semester, SFU had 25,595 undergraduates, with 12,812 of them being full-time and 12,783 part-time. International students made up 21% of the undergraduate student body, of which over 85% came from Asia, the highest proportion being from China at 43%. SFU's undergraduate student union is known as the Simon Fraser Student Society (SFSS).

Graduate
The university enrolled 4,701 graduate students in the Fall 2021 semester, with international students constituting 32% of the graduate student population. A Graduate Student Society supports and advocates for graduate students at the university.

Continuing education
SFU also offers non-credit programs and courses to adult students. , SFU Continuing Studies offers more than 300 courses and 27 certificate and diploma programs, mostly delivered either online or part-time from SFU's downtown Vancouver or Surrey campus. Continuing Studies also manages a part-time degree completion program, called SFU NOW: Nights or Weekends, for working adults pursuing a bachelor's degree.

Staff unions

Teaching assistants, tutor markers, sessional instructors, language instructors, Graduate Facilitators and Research Assistants at SFU are unionized. The union, the Teaching Support Staff Union (TSSU), is independent. Faculty and lecturers are members of the Faculty Association. Staff are members of the Canadian Union of Public Employees (CUPE), the Administrative and Professional Staff Association (APSA), or Polyparty. A few positions at the university, such as some in Human Resources and senior administrative positions, fall outside the five associations or unions above.

Under the previous president, Andrew Petter, SFU's administration has incurred a number of grievances and bad faith bargaining judgments. During their most recent rounds of bargaining, both the TSSU and CUPE local 3338 resorted to job action, and the BC Labour Relations Board found SFU's administration to be bargaining in bad faith with the CUPE local. Conflicts since then include unpaid wages (in Fall 2013, 18% of TSSU members reported that they were not paid on the first payday; by the term's third payday, some members still had not received their wages), and a health plan, redundant with the provincial health plan available to all international students after their first three months in-province and costing double a prior plan's cost, in which international students are automatically enrolled.

Reputation

Simon Fraser University has placed in various international post-secondary school rankings. In the 2022 Academic Ranking of World Universities rankings, the university ranked 301–400 in the world and 13–17 in Canada. The 2023 QS World University Rankings ranked the university 328th in the world and thirteenth in Canada. The 2023 Times Higher Education World University Rankings placed Simon Fraser 251–300 in the world, and 11–13 in Canada. In U.S. News & World Report 2022–23 global university rankings, the university placed 317th in the world, and 12th in Canada. In Maclean's 2023 rankings, the university placed first in their comprehensive university category. The university also placed ninth in Maclean's reputation category. Simon Fraser University was ranked despite having opted out from participation in Maclean's graduate survey since 2006.

In the World’s Universities for Real Impact (WURI) 2022 rankings, SFU ranked 18th in the world, and 1st in Canada.  In QS's 2022 graduate employability ranking, the university ranked 301–500 in the world, and 10–17 in Canada.

Research
In 2020, Simon Fraser University received a sponsored research income (external sources of research funds) of C$167.256 million, the 17th highest in Canada. In the same year, the university's faculty averaged a sponsored research income of $188,600, while graduates averaged $34,000.

Simon Fraser's research performance has been noted by several bibliometric university rankings, which uses citation analysis to evaluates the impact a university has on academic publications. In 2019, the Performance Ranking of Scientific Papers for World Universities ranked Simon Fraser 378th in the world, and 16th in Canada. In University Ranking by Academic Performance's 2018–19 rankings, the university placed 362nd in the world, and 15th in Canada.

SFU also works with other universities and agencies to operate joint research facilities. These include Bamfield Marine Station, a major centre for teaching and research in marine biology; TRIUMF, a powerful cyclotron used in subatomic physics and chemistry research. SFU is also a partner institution in Great Northern Way Campus Ltd in Vancouver. In March 2006, SFU approved an affiliation agreement with a private college for international students to be housed adjacent to its Burnaby campus. This new college named Fraser International College, which was in the Multi Tenant Facility (now renamed as "Discovery 2 Building") located in Discovery Parks Trust SFU site, is now moved into "Discovery 1 Building" after Discovery Parks Trust returned the building to Simon Fraser University. The MODAL Research Group, based at Simon Fraser, partners with multiple Canadian universities and arts organizations to carry out multi-disciplinary research in the arts with an emphasis on the study of artistic learning and engagement.

In 2008, SFU has the highest publication impact among Canadian comprehensive universities and the highest success rates per faculty member in competitions for federal research council funding from the Natural Sciences and Engineering Research Council (NSERC) and the Social Sciences and Humanities Research Council (SSHRC). 

In 2017, Simon Fraser University entered into an agreement with Huawei to receive cloud computing equipment.

In 2022, Simon Fraser University announced the creation of the cross-disciplinary Institute of Neuroscience and Neurotechnology (INN)  research hub to empower neuroscience-related research and collaboration across the university.

Student life
The student newspaper The Peak was established shortly after the university opened and is circulated throughout the university. CJSF-FM radio is the school's radio station, broadcasting from 90.1 FM to Burnaby and surrounding communities, online at www.cjsf.ca or on cable at 93.9 FM. The Simon Fraser Student Society provides funding for over 300 campus clubs. Various campus events include the annual Terry Fox Run, Gung Haggis Fat Choy, Clubs Week, and other multi-cultural events.

The Tau chapter of Phrateres, a non-exclusive, non-profit social-service club, was installed here in 1966. Between 1924 and 1967, 23 chapters of Phrateres were installed in universities across North America, including the Theta chapter nearby at the University of British Columbia.

Greek organizations
Six Greek organizations have formed SFU arms, although none are recognized by the university pursuant to a policy enacted in 1966: 

Fraternities:
 Phi Kappa Pi National Fraternity, Omega Epsilon Chapter
 Delta Kappa Epsilon International Fraternity, Tau Beta Chapter

Sororities:
 Kappa Beta Gamma International Sorority, Alpha Gamma Chapter
 Delta Alpha Theta National Sorority, Beta Chapter
Alpha Pi Phi International Sorority, Eta Chapter
Tau Sigma Phi National Sorority, Epsilon Chapter

Co-ed Professional Fraternities:
 Phi Delta Epsilon International Pre-Medical Fraternity, CAN Beta Chapter
 Alpha Kappa Psi, The Professional Business Fraternity

Athletics

The university's varsity sports teams are called the Simon Fraser Red Leafs, and the mascot is a Scottish Terrier named McFogg the Dog. In sports and other competitions, there tends to be a strong rivalry between SFU and The University of British Columbia.

The team is the first and currently the only athletic program from outside of the United States that competes in the National Collegiate Athletic Association (NCAA). Before joining the NCAA, the team used to compete in both the Canadian Interuniversity Sports (CIS, now U Sports) and the National Association of Intercollegiate Athletics (NAIA). In total, SFU has 15 varsity sport teams and 300 athletes. All varsity teams compete for their respective NCAA national championships, except for the Women's Wrestling team who competes for the Women's College Wrestling Association's national championship.

Beside the varsity teams, SFU also houses various competitive club teams, including Men's Lacrosse, who currently competes in the Men's Collegiate Lacrosse Association, and Men's Hockey, who currently competes in the British Columbia Intercollegiate Hockey League. Other club teams include rugby, cheerleading, rowing, quidditch, and field hockey.

SFU has won the NAIA NACDA Director's Cup five times, among others. On Friday, July 10, 2009, the NCAA announced that it had accepted SFU as a Division II member and would begin after a two-year transition period. SFU later competed in the Great Northwest Athletic Conference. It is the first Canadian university to be accepted as a member of the NCAA at any level. In 2012, the team was accepted as the first international full member of the NCAA.

Many former team athletes later represented Canada during the Olympic Games, including gold medalists Carol Huynh and Daniel Igali, and Olympic medalists Sue Holloway and Hugh Fisher. Other team alumni include: Jay Triano, Chris Rinke, wrestler Ari Taub, and Carolyn Murray.

Notable alumni

As of 2023, the university's alumni network included over 180,000 graduates from over 140 countries. Alumni have received a number of academic awards. As of 2011, four SFU graduates have been named Rhodes Scholars, including Joel Bakan.

Another notable alumni was Terry Fox, an athlete and an alumnus of SFU who embarked on the run across Canada to raise money and awareness for Cancer research. Fox's Marathon of Hope had a lasting legacy, with the Terry Fox Run being held around the world in commemoration of his efforts. In 2001, SFU conferred an honorary degree to Betty Fox, mother of Terry Fox and honorary chair of the Terry Fox Foundation.

Other notable alumni from the university include:

 Barbara Adler, musician, poet, and storyteller
 Mimi Ajzenstadt (born 1956), Israeli criminologist; President of the Open University of Israel
 Francesco Aquilini, owner of the Vancouver Canucks and Rogers Arena
 Mahamudu Bawumia, vice president of Ghana; former deputy governor, Bank of Ghana
Ryan Beedie, president of Beedie Development and key supporter of the Beedie School of Business, which was renamed after him after a $22 million donation.
 Bettina Bradbury, professor emerita in the Department of History and Gender Studies at York University and a fellow of the Royal Society of Canada
 Cam Broten, former leader of the Saskatchewan New Democratic Party
 Gordon Campbell, former premier of British Columbia
 Ian Campbell, Squamish Nation chief
 Calvin Chen, Taiwanese actor, singer, host
 Jim Chu, former chief constable of the Vancouver Police Department
 Glen Clark, former premier of British Columbia
 Marc Dalton, current MLA for Maple Ridge-Mission
 Dino Patti Djalal, former Deputy Minister of Foreign Affairs of Indonesia
Andrea Donaldson, theatre director and dramaturge
 Ujjal Dosanjh, former premier of British Columbia
 Bill Dow, actor, and professor of Theatre and Mythology at SFU
 Ann Marie Fleming, filmmaker, writer, and visual artist
 Cary Fowler, American agriculturalist
 Julia P. Gelardi, American royal historian
 Lyn Hancock, photojournalist and author
 Leon Hatziioannou, Canadian football player
 Ed Hill award-winning stand-up comedian
 Zabeen Hirji, former chief human resources officer for the Royal Bank of Canada
 Karilynn Ming Ho, artist
 Curtis Hodgson, professional lacrosse player
 Hafeez Hoorani, Pakistani physicist
 Carol Huynh, Olympic gold medalist
 Daniel Igali, Olympic gold medalist
 Marianne Ignace, linguistics professor at Simon Fraser University and Director of SFU's Indigenous Languages Program and First Nations Language Centre
 Sut Jhally, communications professor and media expert
 Dan Kearns, Canadian football player
 Steve Kearns, Canadian football player
 Roger Kettlewell, Canadian football player
 Salleh Said Keruak, Malaysian politician and former Chief Minister Of Sabah
 Vincent Kok, actor, director, and scriptwriter
 Jenny Wai Ching Kwan, MLA for Vancouver-Mount Pleasant
 Isabel Ge Mahe, vice president and managing director of Greater China, Apple Inc.
 Sonija Kwok, actress and Miss Hong Kong 1999
 Michelle Lang, journalist
 Minh Le, creator of the popular Half-Life mod Counter-Strike
 Ken Lum, artist
 Marco Marra, scientist, director of Canada's Michael Smith Genome Sciences Centre, BC Cancer Agency
 Rachel Marsden, internationally syndicated columnist and talk-show host
 Loscil (Scott Morgan), musician, member of Destroyer
 Pakalitha Mosisili, prime minister of the Kingdom of Lesotho
 Mark Okerstrom, 2004 President/CEO of Expedia Group
 Carmen Papalia, artist
 Deanna C. C. Peluso, musician and composer
 Álvaro Santos Pereira, former Minister of Economy, Labour, Transport, Public Works and Communications of Portugal.
 Justin Ring, former CFL football player
 Melissa Roxburgh, actress Manifest (TV series)
 Mehdi Sadaghdar, electrical engineer, host of ElectroBOOM
 Alice L. Pérez Sánchez, organic chemist, medical researcher 
 Maha Al-Saati, independent filmmaker
 Kelly Sheridan, the voice for Barbie in the Barbie film series from 2001 to 2010 and from 2012 to 2015
 Kathy Slade, artist
 Glen Suitor, sportscaster, former Canadian Football League player
 Sam Sullivan, former mayor of Vancouver
 Elsie Sunderland, environmental chemist; professor at Harvard 
 Milun Tesovic, computer programmer and internet entrepreneur; founder of MetroLyrics
 Shashaa Tirupati, Canadian playback singer, songwriter, and music producer
 Jay Triano, lead assistant coach of the Charlotte Hornets
 Margaret Trudeau, former wife of Canadian former Prime Minister Pierre Trudeau
 Robert Turner, scientist, director at the Max Planck Institute for Human Cognitive and Brain Sciences
 David Usher, singer and songwriter
 John G. Webb, interventional cardiologist, performed the first transapical TAVI in 2006
 Choi Woo-shik, South Korean actor
 Yohana Yembise, Indonesian Minister of Women Empowerment and Child Protection
 Victor Montagliani, Canadian Businessman, President of CONCACAF and member of the FIFA Council
 Zella Wolofsky, Canadian modern dancer and HCI researcher
 John Oswald, Canadian composer best known for coining the term for Plunderphonics, the practice of making new music out of previously existing recordings.

Honorary alumni
At each convocation, SFU awards honorary degrees to various people from around the world for their activities and pursuits. In 1967, SFU awarded an honorary LL.D. (doctor of laws) to Marshall McLuhan, the first honorary degree awarded by the university. Ida Halpern, an ethnomusicologist whose professional papers are held in part by SFU, was similarly awarded an honorary LL.D. in 1978. On April 20, 2004, SFU conferred honorary degrees upon three Nobel Peace Prize recipients: the 14th Dalai Lama, Bishop Desmond Tutu, and human rights activist Shirin Ebadi. Other honorary alumni include award-winning filmmaker Costa-Gavras, skier Nancy Greene Raine, Milton Wong, Doris Shadbolt, economist Jeffrey Sachs, Peter Gzowski, Douglas Coupland, Lui Passaglia, Romeo Dallaire, Canadian businessman Stephen Jarislowsky, Iain Baxter, American agriculturalist Cary Fowler, experimental psychologist Steven Pinker, primatologist and environmentalist Jane Goodall, Martha Piper, Sarah McLachlan, Rick Hansen, Kim Campbell, Ray Hyman, Dr. A.P.J Abdul Kalam (Rocket Scientist and Former President of India) and Bill Nye.

Arms
The school's original coat of arms was used from the university's inception until 2006, at which point the Board of Governors voted to adapt the old coat of arms and thereby register a second coat of arms. The adaptation replaced two crosslets with books after some in the university asserted the crosses had misled prospective international students into believing SFU was a private, religious institution rather than a public, secular one. In 2007, the university decided to register both the old coat of arms and the revised coat of arms featuring the books. In 2007, a new marketing logo was unveiled, consisting of white letters on block red.

See also

 CJSF-FM
 Education in Canada
 Higher education in British Columbia
 List of colleges and universities named after people
 List of universities in British Columbia
 Simon Fraser Student Society
 The Faculty of Communication, Art and Technology at Simon Fraser University
 The Peak
 Woodward's building
List of universities in Canada

References

Further reading

External links

 
 Official athletics website
 SFU's Material Research Lab

 
1965 establishments in British Columbia
Arthur Erickson buildings
Buildings and structures in Burnaby
Educational institutions established in 1965
Modernist architecture in Canada
Tourist attractions in Burnaby
Universities in British Columbia